San Matías is a municipality in the Honduran department of El Paraíso.

Populated places in Honduras